William Plant (September 10, 1892 – May 1, 1969) was an American racewalker. He competed in the 10 km walk at the 1920 Summer Olympics.

References

1892 births
1969 deaths
Sportspeople from Brooklyn
Track and field athletes from New York City
American male racewalkers
Olympic track and field athletes of the United States
Athletes (track and field) at the 1920 Summer Olympics